Hanbury Street is a street running from Spitalfields to Whitechapel, London Borough of Tower Hamlets, in the East End of London. It runs east from Commercial Street to the junction of Old Montague Street and Vallance Road at the east end. The eastern section is restricted to pedal cycles and pedestrians only.

History
The street was laid out in the seventeenth century, and was originally known as Browne's Lane after the original developer. Its present name is derived from that of a local family who owned land there in the seventeenth century.

In 1884, Florence Eleanor Soper, the daughter-in-law of General William Booth of The Salvation Army,  inaugurated The Women's Social Work, which was run from a small house in Hanbury Street. This home for women was set up in the hopes that they would not have to turn to prostitution and provided a safe haven for those who were already suffering from the trade.

On 8 September 1888, the body of Annie Chapman was found in the backyard of No.29 Hanbury Street. Chapman is generally held to have been the second victim of Jack the Ripper. Today, buildings with shops below and flats above can still be found on the south side of Hanbury Street, across from the murder site.  But No.29, which was on the north side of the street, no longer exists, having been demolished.  The Old Truman Brewery was extended to cover the entire block on the north side of Hanbury Street; and since 2004 this has been the site of Sunday (Up)Market .

British entertainer Bud Flanagan was born at No.12 Hanbury Street in 1896.

Neo-Nazi militant David Copeland attempted to detonate a nail-bomb upon Hanbury Street on Saturday 24 April 1999. Copeland intended to place the bomb on adjoining Brick Lane during its weekly market held on Sundays, but mistakenly planted the bomb on a Saturday when the road was less busy. After realising his mistake and unwilling to change the timer on the bomb, he left it on Hanbury Street instead. At 5.45pm a member of the public found the bag and took it to Brick Lane police station which was closed, and then put it into his car boot, driving along Brick Lane. On realising it could have been a bomb he left the car at the junction with Fashion Street and called police, at which time the device exploded injuring six people and destroying two vehicles.

Gallery

References 

Jack the Ripper
Streets in the London Borough of Tower Hamlets
Spitalfields